Nancy Wechsler is an activist, writer, and former member of the Ann Arbor City Council, where she came out as a lesbian while serving her term. 
Elected to the City Council alongside fellow Human Rights Party candidate Jerry DeGrieck, both Wechsler and DeGrieck came out while serving, and are typically cited as the first openly LGBT elected officials in the United States.

Ann Arbor City Council
Wechsler and Jerry DeGrieck were elected to the Ann Arbor City Council as members of the Human Rights Party on April 3, 1972. Political observers did not believe the third party had much chance of winning any seats, but the party's liberal platform appealed to young voters and beat university professors running as Democrats in the 1st and 2nd wards. At the time of the election, Wechsler was 22, a recent University of Michigan graduate and an employee of a local college bookstore. In 1973, while serving on the council, Wechsler came out as a lesbian and DeGrieck as a gay man in response to an anti-LGBT incident at a local restaurant. In 1974, rather than seek re-election, Wechsler moved to Boston, Massachusetts where she went on to become a writer for the Gay Community News. Out lesbian Kathy Kozachenko was elected to fill Wechsler's seat on the council, becoming the first openly LGBT politician to win an election in the United States.

References

Lesbian politicians
American LGBT rights activists
Politicians from Ann Arbor, Michigan
American LGBT city council members
Michigan city council members
Living people
Human Rights Party (United States) politicians
LGBT people from Michigan
University of Michigan alumni
Writers from Ann Arbor, Michigan
Women city councillors in Michigan
Year of birth missing (living people)
21st-century American women